Punan Bah or Punan is an ethnic group found in Sarawak, Malaysia and in Kalimantan, Indonesia. The Punan Bah people are distinct and unrelated to the semi-nomadic Penan people. Their name stems from two rivers along the banks of which they have been living since time immemorial. They do have other names: Mikuang Bungulan or Mikuang and Aveang Buan. But those terms are only used ritually these days.

The Punan (or Punan Ba) have never been nomadic. In the old days, they based their living on a mixed economy – Swidden agriculture with hill paddy as the main crop, supplemented by a range of tropical plants which include maniok, taro, sugar cane, tobacco, etc. Hunting, especially wild boar, fishing, and gathering of forest resources, are the other important factors in their economy.

However, in the late 1980s, many Punan, notably the younger, more educated, gradually migrated to urban areas such as Bintulu, Sibu, Kuching and Kuala Lumpur in search of better living. However, they didn't abandon their longhouses altogether. Many would still return home, especially during major festivities such as Harvest Festival or Bungan festival as it is known among Punan.

Punan is a stratified society of 'laja' (aristocrats), 'panyen' (commoners), and 'lipen' (slaves). This determines their historical traditions that have been preserved. Just like most of the history of European Middle Ages is linked to and mainly concerned the various ruling monarchs, so are the historical and mythical traditions of Punan closely connected to their rulings aristocrats.

Relation to sub-ethnic Punans 

There is this common misunderstanding that all the so-called Punan on the island of Borneo are related and referring to the same tribe. In Sarawak, for example, there is the confusion between Punan and Penan. On the other hand, throughout the island of Borneo, the term Punan often indiscriminately used referring to the then (unknown or yet to be classified) tribes as such as Punan Busang, Penihing, Sajau Hovongan, Uheng Kareho, Merah, Aput, Tubu, Bukat, Ukit, Habongkot, Penyawung as Punan. This heritage from colonial times still remain until today.

As a result, there are now more than 20 different tribes or ethnics with the name Punan that may be related or unrelated to one another in the island of Borneo. These tribes include:
 Punan Aoheng or Pnihing of East Kalimantan, Indonesia
 Punan Aput of East Kalimantan, Indonesia
 Punan Basap of East Kalimantan, Indonesia
 Punan Batu of East Kalimantan, Indonesia
 Punan Batu 1 of Sarawak, Malaysia
 Dayak Bukat of Sarawak of Malaysia, East Kalimantan and West Kalimantan of Indonesia
 Punan Busang
 Punan Habongkot
 Punan Hovongan of Kapuas Hulu Regency, West Kalimantan, Indonesia
 Punan Bungan of West Kalimantan, Indonesia
 Punan Kelay / Kelai of East Kalimantan, Indonesia
 Punan Lisum
 Punan Merah (Siau) of East Kalimantan, Indonesia
 Punan Merap of East Kalimantan, Indonesia
 Punan Murung of Murung Raya, Central Kalimantan, Indonesia
 Punan Nibong of Brunei and Sarawak, Malaysia
 Punan Panyawung
 Punan Sajau of East Kalimantan, Indonesia
 Punan Tubu of East Kalimantan, Indonesia
 Punan Uheng Kereho / Keriau of Kapuas Hulu Regency, West Kalimantan, Indonesia
 Punan Ukit / Bukitan / Beketan of Sarawak, Malaysia and East Kalimantan, Indonesia

Ethnic classification 
Officially, as under the Sarawak Interpretation Ordinance, Punan is group under Kajang together with Sekapan, Kejaman, Lahanan and Sihan.

Unofficially, they are also included in the politically coined term Orang Ulu – popularised by a political association known as Orang Ulu National Association or (OUNA). The association is a Kayan and Kenyah dominated association which they established in 1969.

Punan longhouses 
Punan are mostly found around Bintulu, Sarawak. Punan peoples can only be found at Pandan, Jelalong and Kakus in Bintulu Division; along the Rajang River, their longhouses dotted areas spanning from Merit District to lower Belaga town.

The Punan are believed to be one of the earliest peoples to have settled in the central part of Borneo, the Rajang River and Balui areas together with the Sekapan, Kejaman and Lahanan. However, the mass migrations of Kayans, subsequently followed by the warfaring Ibans into Rejang and Balui areas approximately some 200 years ago, forced the Punan communities living in these areas retreating to Kakus and subsequently to Kemena basin.

As of 2006, there were more than 10 Punan settlements (longhouses) found along the Rejang, Kakus, Kemena and Jelalong river. These settlements (longhouses) are:
 Punan Lovuk Sama,
 Punan Lovuk Ba,
 Punan Lovuk Biau,
 Punan Lovuk Meluyou,
 Punan Lovuk Lirung Belang (name by Rumah Bilong before and now as known as Rumah Ado)
 Punan Lovuk Mina,
 Punan Lovuk Pandan (also Rumah Nyipa Tingang), and
 Punan Lo'o Buong (Jelalong also known as Rumah Adi.

The total Punan population is estimated to be around 3000–5000 people.

Language 

Punan speak the Bah-Biau Punan language, one of the Punan languages. Although often confused with Penan, Punan is closer to the language spoken by the Sekapans and Kejamans.

Here are some words spoken in Punan:
1. Nu denge?  - How are you?
2. Nu ngaro no?  - What is your name?
3. Piro umun no?  - How old are you?
4. Tupu koman si  - Do you have your lunch/dinner/breakfast?

Religion and beliefs 
Punan traditional religion was a form of animist known as "Besavik". The Brooke era saw the arrival of Christian missionaries, bringing education and modern medicine into Sarawak. But the Punan communities remain with their traditional religion of Besavik and subsequently adopting a cult religion - Bungan brought by Jok Apui, a Kenyah from Kalimantan.

However, the late 1990s showed an increase in the number of Punan converting to Christianity. This is partly due to more and more Punan becoming educated and modernised. As of 2006, almost half of Punan are now Christian, leaving only the elderly, less educated still remain observing "Bungan" religion.

The Punan have a unique burial custom. In the early days they did not bury their aristocrats or lajar. Instead they built a pole known as kelirieng of 50-meter height to lay down their beloved leaders. In Sarawak it is estimated that there are fewer than 30 kelirieng left standing. The Punan still practise a secondary burial ceremony, whereby the dead body is kept at their longhouses for at least 3–7 days. This is partly to give more time for far-away relatives to pay their last respects to the deceased.

Current associations 
There are two Punan association that are in existence today:-
 Persatuan Kebangsaan Punan (Punan National Association), Malaysia.
 Yayasan Adat Punan (Punan Culture Foundation), Indonesia.

References

External links
 Nicolaisen, IDA. 1976. Form and Function of Punan Bah Ethno-historical Tradition in Sarawak Museum Journal Vol XXIV No. 45 (New Series). Kuching.
 Punan National Association.
 Leigh, MICHEAL. 2002. Mapping the People of Sarawak. UNIMAS. Samarahan.
 The Official Punan Community site

Ethnic groups in Indonesia
Ethnic groups in Sarawak
Dayak people